Johan Friberg Da Cruz (born 4 June 1986) is a Swedish former professional footballer who played as a midfielder.

Career
Da Cruz was born in Göteborg. He played professionally for GAIS in the Allsvenskan.

Personal life
His older brother Bobbie is also a former footballer.

Notes

External links 
 
 

1986 births
Living people
Footballers from Gothenburg
Swedish footballers
Association football defenders
Association football midfielders
GAIS players
BK Häcken players
Ljungskile SK players
Västra Frölunda IF players
Superettan players
Ettan Fotboll players
Division 2 (Swedish football) players
Swedish people of Cape Verdean descent
Swedish sportspeople of African descent
Swedish expatriate footballers
Swedish expatriate sportspeople in Denmark
Expatriate men's footballers in Denmark